Wendy Anne Bickmore  (born 28 July 1961) is a British genome biologist known for her research on the organisation of genomic material in cells.

Early life and education
Bickmore was born at Shoreham-by-Sea on 28 July 1961 to Beryl and Keith Bickmore. She was educated at Chichester High School For Girls and obtained an undergraduate Bachelor of Arts degree in biochemistry from the University of Oxford and her PhD from the University of Edinburgh for research analysing nucleic acid sequences from the Y chromosome of humans supervised by Howard Cooke and Adrian Bird.

Career 
Bickmore’s interest in science began as a teen being influenced by her biology teacher and her parents who were keen amateur gardeners. Her interest in biochemistry was confirmed having read ‘The Chemistry of Life’ by Steven Rose and she went on to study biochemistry at university. Her Ph.D. research examined DNA sequences from the Y chromosome in humans. She was an independent fellow at the Lister Institute of Preventive Medicine from 1991 until 1996.

Research and career
Her work has focused on how DNA, chromosomes and specific genes are organised and packaged in the cell nucleus, how this process is regulated during development to facilitate the expression of genes, and how aberrant genome organisation is linked to disease. In 2020, she was recognized for her research examining the likelihood that people will develop serious symptoms of the COVID-19 disease. 

Bickmore was president of The Genetics Society from 2015 until 2018. As of 2021, she is director of the MRC Human Genetics Unit at the University of Edinburgh. She is a member of the editorial board for Genes & Development.

Selected publications

Awards and honours
Bickmore was awarded EMBO Membership in 2001, elected a Fellow of the Royal Society of Edinburgh (FRSE) in 2005 and elected a Fellow of the Academy of Medical Sciences in 2005 (FMedSci). She was elected a Fellow of the Royal Society (FRS) in 2017. She was appointed Commander of the Order of the British Empire (CBE) in the 2021 New Year Honours for services to biomedical sciences and women in science.

Personal life 
She is a member of the organisation Trees for Life which is working to restore the forest in the Highlands of Scotland.

References

1961 births
20th-century British biologists
21st-century British biologists
20th-century British women scientists
21st-century British women scientists
Academics of the University of Edinburgh
British women biologists
Fellows of the Royal Society
Fellows of the Royal Society of Edinburgh
Female Fellows of the Royal Society
Living people
Members of the European Molecular Biology Organization
Commanders of the Order of the British Empire